The Sigerson Cup  is the trophy for the premier Gaelic football championship among Higher Education institutions (Universities, Colleges and Institutes of Technology) in Ireland. It traditionally begins in mid January and ends in late February. The Sigerson Cup competition is administered by Comhairle Ard Oideachais Cumann Lúthchleas Gael (CLG), the GAA's Higher Education Council.

The Trench Cup is the second tier football competition, Corn na Mac Léinn the third tier and Corn Comhairle Ardoideachais the fourth tier. The Fitzgibbon Cup is the hurling equivalent of the Sigerson Cup.

History
There was no intervarsity Gaelic sports competition until Dr. George Sigerson, born at Holy Hill near Strabane, County Tyrone (11 January 1836 – 17 February 1925), a Professor of Zoology at University College Dublin, eminent physician, minor poet and literary figure and leading light in the Celtic Renaissance in Ireland offered up a trophy in 1911. The cup was in the shape of a mether, an ancient Irish drinking vessel, and had four handles representing each of the four Irish provinces. Sigerson presented the trophy at the first tournament dinner, at the old Gresham Hotel, Dublin, in May 1911. W. J. O'Riordan received the cup on behalf of UCC, the first winning team.  In 2009 Sigerson was named in the Sunday Tribunes list of the 125 Most Influential People In GAA History. The trophy itself was the longest-serving trophy in national circulation in Gaelic games, until it was replaced by an identical model in 2001.

From its inception Sigerson's alma mater, UCD have dominated the competition winning 33 titles, their greatest era being in the 1970s when they won the title six times in seven years. These Sigerson Cup wins proved to be the launch pad for success further afield, as UCD went on to add two All-Ireland Club Championship wins to their haul.

In the early days of the tournament, only UCD, UCC and UCG took part. The competition has been run off every year since, with the exceptions of 1920, 1942 and 1967. UCC are second in the pecking order in terms of championships won, currently having 23 victories to their credit. UCG (now NUI Galway) holds the record for the longest winning sequence. After their victory in 1936, the Galway University club went on to claim the next five titles and their six in a row is still an unequalled record.

As the years passed, the domination of the original big three was challenged by a number of new participants. Queen's University Belfast entered the competition for the first time in 1923, but did not enter thereafter until 1933. They have participated in the competition every year since and won their first title in 1958. Queen's have eight titles to their name, winning their eighth in 2007 by defeating UUJ 0-15 to 0-14 in the final.

As society in general changed with time, and more and more people began to enter third-level education, the number of colleges and universities grew rapidly. The impact of these changes on the Sigerson Cup has been immeasurable. Trinity College Dublin first entered in 1963, followed by NUIM in 1972, the New University of Ulster (later University of Ulster, Coleraine) in 1976, and University of Ulster, Jordanstown in 1985. The next colleges to enter were Thomond, NIHE Limerick and St Mary's, Belfast, all in 1988. Further expansion and the admission of Regional Technical Colleges to the competition saw Dublin City University enter in 1990 and the RTCs from Athlone in 1991, Sligo in 1992, Cork in 1995, Tralee in 1996 and Dublin IT in 1998. All of these third-level institutions have claimed Sigerson Cup titles since the mid-nineties, most recently Dublin IT in 2013.

Tralee's entry to the competition proved especially fruitful when they won successive titles in 1997, 1998 and 1999. The stranglehold of the larger Universities, UCD, UCG and UCC, has now been broken. The colleges in the north have gained a new confidence in the competition, and with a whole raft of new participants joining in recent years, the trophy is now harder won than ever. Since the 2000/01 season IT Sligo and DCU have both won the Sigerson Cup three times. The Silver Jubilee Tournament was played in 1935/36, won by University College Dublin; the Golden Jubilee Tournament in 1961/62, won by University College Dublin; the Diamond Jubilee tournament in 1971/72, won by University College Cork; the 75th tournament in 1986/87, won by University of Ulster Jordanstown; and the Centennial tournament in 2011/12, won by Dublin City University.

The GAA Higher Education Cups are currently sponsored by the Electric Ireland who follow on from The Irish Daily Mail, Ulster Bank, Datapac, Bus Éireann and Independent.ie as investors in Ireland's premier Higher Education GAA sports competitions.

Mick Raftery (UCG & Mayo/Galway) holds the record as an eight-time Sigerson Cup winner, 1933–41.

Current competition format
The 2018-19 competition begins with a double-elimination stage where every team is guaranteed at least two games. All matches finish on the day. If the score is level at the end of normal time, two ten minute periods of extra time are played each way. If the score is still level at the end of extra time, the winning team is determined by a free-taking competition.Double-elimination stage In round 1 all sixteen teams compete in eight matches.
 In round 2, the eight beaten teams from round 1 playoff in four matches. The four losing teams in round 2 are eliminated.
 In round 3, four of the eight winning teams from round 1 play the four winning teams from round 2. The other four winning teams from round 1 are given byes to the quarter-finals. The four losing teams in round 3 are eliminated.Knockout stageTraditionally the semi-finals and final took place at a single host venue over a weekend known as 'The Sigerson Weekend'. This arrangement was abandoned in 2018-19 with the semi-finals and final being organised as separate events.

 In the quarter-finals, the four remaining winning teams from round 1 who were given a bye in round 3 play the four winning teams from round 3. The four losing teams are eliminated.
 In the semi-finals, the four winning teams from the quarter-finals playoff in two matches. The two losing teams are eliminated.
 In the final, the two winning teams from the semi-finals meet.

Roll of honour
Wins listed by College

Finalists who have not won the Sigerson Cup:

 Garda Síochána College
 Trinity College Dublin
 University of Limerick

Winners listed by year

 1910/11 UCC
 1911/12 UCG
 1912/13 UCD
 1913/14 UCC
 1914/15 UCD
 1915/16 UCC
 1916/17 UCD
 1917/18 UCD
 1918/19 UCC
 1919/20 UCD
 1920/21 Not Played 1921/22 UCG
 1922/23 UCC
 1923/24 UCD
 1924/25 UCC
 1925/26 UCC
 1926/27 UCD
 1927/28 UCC
 1928/29 UCD
 1929/30 UCD
 1930/31 UCD
 1931/32 UCD
 1932/33 UCD
 1933/34 UCG
 1934/35 UCG
 1935/36 UCD
 1936/37 UCG
 1937/38 UCG
 1938/39 UCG
 1939/40 UCG
 1940/41 UCG
 1941/42 UCG
 1942/43 Not Played 1943/44 UCC
 1944/45 UCD
 1945/46 UCD
 1946/47 UCC
 1947/48 UCD
 1948/49 UCG
 1949/50 UCD
 1950/51 UCG
 1951/52 UCC
 1952/53 UCC
 1953/54 UCD
 1954/55 UCG
 1955/56 UCD
 1956/57 UCD
 1957/58 UCD
 1958/59 QUB
 1959/60 UCD
 1960/61 UCG
 1961/62 UCD
 1962/63 UCG
 1963/64 UCG
 1964/65 QUB
 1965/66 UCC
 1966/67 UCC
 1967/68 UCD
 1968/69 UCC
 1969/70 UCC
 1970/71 QUB
 1971/72 UCC
 1972/73 UCD
 1973/74 UCD
 1974/75 UCD
 1975/76 SPC Maynooth
 1976/77 UCD
 1977/78 UCD
 1978/79 UCD
 1979/80 UCG
 1980/81 UCG
 1981/82 QUB
 1982/83 UCG
 1983/84 UCG
 1984/85 UCD
 1985/86 UUJ
 1986/87 UUJ
 1987/88 UCC
 1988/89 St Mary's, Belfast
 1989/90 QUB
 1990/91 UUJ
 1991/92 UCG
 1992/93 QUB
 1993/94 UCC
 1994/95 UCC
 1995/96 UCD
 1996/97 Tralee RTC
 1997/98 IT Tralee
 1998/99 IT Tralee
 1999/00 QUB
 2000/01 UUJ
 2001/02 IT Sligo
 2002/03 NUI Galway
 2003/04 IT Sligo
 2004/05 IT Sligo
 2005/06 DCU
 2006/07 QUB
 2007/08 UUJ
 2008/09 Cork IT
 2009/10 DCU
 2010/11 UCC
 2011/12 DCU
 2012/13 Dublin IT
 2013/14 UCC
 2014/15 DCU
 2015/16 UCD
 2016/17 St Mary's, Belfast
 2017/18 UCD
 2018/19 UCC
 2019/20 DCU
 2020/21 No competition
 2021/22 NUI Galway
 2022/23 UCC
 

Sigerson Shield [Plate] winners
The Sigerson Shield [Plate] competition was introduced in 1976/77 for the teams beaten in the quarter-finals of the Sigerson Cup, in essence to provide competition for the losing teams over the three-day Sigerson weekend. Trinity College Dublin (Dublin University) were the inaugural winners at Fahy Field, Galway. As a consequence of the Sigerson Cup function at the Dublin University Boat Club, Islandbridge, in February 1990 which descended into an 'orgy of destruction', the CAO decided to scrap the three-day finals weekend format to avoid any recurrence of such chaotic behaviour. In 1990/91 the multi-game weekend format was replaced with all the games being played at separate venues. In 1991/92, the quarter-finals were run off separately from the semi-finals and final, the latter being played over a two-day Sigerson weekend; the same format was used in 1992/93. From 1993/94 the final stages of both the Sigerson and Trench Cups were staged over the same weekend. In 1992/93 the Sigerson Shield was contested between the losing semi-finalists, University College Galway and the University of Ulster at Jordanstown.

 1976/77 TCD 1-8 NUU† 0-3
 1977/78 TCD 3-9 QUB 1-9
 1978/79 TCD 1-10 QUB 1-6
 1979/80 UCC 3-16 QUB 1-9
 1980/81 QUB 0-7 NUU 0-6
 1981/82 UCC 4-6 NUU 0-12
 1982/83 UCD 0-9 SPC Maynooth 0-7
 1983/84 SPC Maynooth 0-13 TCD 0-7
 1984/85 TCD 1-10 UU Jordanstown 2-6
 1985/86 QUB 2-6 TCD 1-8
 1986/87 QUB 1-11 UCG 0-4
 1987/88 TCD 2-6 NIHE Limerick 1-5
 1988/89 UCG 1-8 UU Jordanstown 1-6
 1989/90 DCU 1-15 UCG 0-15
 1990/91 Not played?
 1991/92 Not Played?
 1992/93 UCG 7-13 UU Jordanstown 3-11
 
† New University of Ulster

Captains of Sigerson Cup winning teams
Unpublished list of playing captains kindly provided by Dónal McAnallen. NB: Some differences exist between this list of playing team captains and publicly visible, wall-mounted lists of college club captains (often non-playing)

Man of the Match/Player of the Tournament and winning top scorers
The accolade of Man of the Match or Player of the Tournament dates at least from the 1980s. The "Player of the Tournament" was not always from the winning team, e.g., 1983/84. Top scorer refers to the player with the highest points tally on the winning side.

Finals listed by yearBold' text indicates first win.

References

 
1911 establishments in Ireland
Gaelic football competitions at Irish universities
Gaelic football cup competitions